United States national football team may refer to:

American football
United States men's national American football team
United States women's national American football team

Association football (soccer)
United States men's national soccer team
United States women's national soccer team

Australian rules football
United States men's national Australian rules football team
United States women's national Australian rules football team

See also
United States national rugby team (disambiguation)